New York Noise is a 2003 compilation album released by Soul Jazz Records. The music of the album compiles features the genre-bending music from New York City released during the late '70s and early '80s, ranging from no wave to mutant disco to hip-hop to art funk among others.  On its release, it received positive reviews from AllMusic, Pitchfork Media and Rolling Stone. A new version of the album with several track re-arrangements was released in 2016.

Release
New York Noise was released by Soul Jazz Records by June 30, 2003. A followup release, titled New York Noise 2 was released later by Soul Jazz.  A new version of the album was released in 2016 with a different tracklisting, adding tracks by artists such as Alan Vega, Chain Gang and Implog.

Reception

At Metacritic, which assigns a normalised rating out of 100 to reviews from mainstream critics, the album has received an average score of 80, indicating universal acclaim, based on seven reviews. Andy Kellman of AllMusic praised the album, stating that "Compilations like this are necessary because they document bygone fragments of time and keep them alive for younger generations. Compilations like this are dangerous because they tend to fall in the hands of young bands who spend more time looking behind than ahead. Besides, who's to say that no wave and post-punk won't spawn their own analogs of traditional blues musicians -- if they haven't already? Still, New York Noise is another title demonstrating that the late '70s and early '80s were awesome for music." Andy Beta of Pitchfork Media praised the album, but compared it to a previous similar compilation by Soul Jazz, In the Beginning There Was Rhythm, stating that "It's long-winded at seventy-one minutes, as most Soul Jazz overviews tend to stay concise (their post-punk counterpart from the UK, In the Beginning was Rhythm, was a half-hour shorter), but trying to assimilate all the important foundations that arose out of this particular lot of ground is near impossible. Lydia Lunch and James "Blood" Ulmer are left out, unfortunately, but there are many vying for its cramped space, and inclusion of The Dance and The Blood surprises. From hip-hop to no-wave, jazz-punk disco to house music to electroclash, sleek funk to crusty noise, there's a lot to cover, and Soul Jazz does the job admirably, touring the biggest landmarks and some of the interesting diversions not on the map, but nonetheless co-existing side by side." The album received praises from Rolling Stone and Q.

Uncut gave the album a negative review, declaring that the "vast majority of it still sounds like what it was: cerebral, bloodless 'dance' music for junkies, the kind of posturing Gotham tripe we used to describe as "atonal" and "angular.""

Track listing
Track listing adapted from the liner notes.

Credits
Credits adapted from the  liner notes.
 Stuart Baker – compiler
 Adrian Self – compiler, sleeve design
 Rent Boyd – design
 Patrick Coupar – liner notes
 Pete Reilly – mastering
 Duncan Cowell – mastering
 Weasel Walter – photography

References

Sources

 
 
 
 

2003 compilation albums
Soul Jazz Records compilation albums